Marco Büchel (born 4 November 1971 in Walenstadt, Switzerland) is a Liechtensteiner retired alpine ski racer.  He participated in a record-tying six Winter Olympics, starting in 1992 and ending in 2010.

Büchel is featured in the OL-floka music video for the 1994 Winter Olympics. He's seen climbing upwards in the combined slalom course, after missing a gate.

Büchel retired following the Super-G race at Garmisch-Partenkirchen (Germany) on 11 March 2010. He celebrated his last race by racing not in the regular catsuit, but by wearing a tuxedo with black Bermuda shorts. As he skied down the course, Büchel slowed down many times to "high-five" various trainers.

He had also appeared on The Amazing Race 18 as contestants had to give him the correct answer for calculating the Length of Liechtenstein.

During his retirement, Büchel frequents South Florida, where he has many American friends.

Results 
World Cup
2003: 2nd in Super-G
World Championships
1999: Silver Medal in Giant slalom
Swiss Championships
1999/2000: Champion in Downhill, Giant Slalom, Combination
2000/2001: Champion in Parallel Slalom

World Cup victories

References

External links
Marco-Buechel.li - official site

Olympic alpine skiers of Liechtenstein
Alpine skiers at the 1992 Winter Olympics
Alpine skiers at the 1994 Winter Olympics
Alpine skiers at the 1998 Winter Olympics
Alpine skiers at the 2002 Winter Olympics
Alpine skiers at the 2006 Winter Olympics
Alpine skiers at the 2010 Winter Olympics
Liechtenstein male alpine skiers
1971 births
Living people
People from Walenstadt